Prenanthes is a genus of plant in the family Asteraceae, often referred to as rattlesnake root.

Molecular analysis in 2009 revealed that the genus as traditionally envisioned is polyphyletic, meaning that it is a conglomeration of species not closely related to one another. All but one species will be moved to other genera, leaving only Prenanthes purpurea. The species, sometimes called purple lettuce, is widespread across much of Europe and the Middle East.

The genus formerly included; Aetheorhiza, Askellia, Brickellia, Chondrilla, Crepidiastrum, Crepis, Emilia, Erythroseris, Faberia, Hololeion, Hypochaeris, Ixeris, Kovalevskiella, Lactuca, Lapsanastrum, Launaea, Lygodesmia, Nabalus, Notoseris, Paraprenanthes, Parasenecio, Picrosia, Sonchella, Sonchus, Soroseris, Stephanomeria, Trixis, and Youngia

References 

Cichorieae
Monotypic Asteraceae genera